The Sousa/Ostwald Award is an annual award given by the American Bandmasters Association for a composition for concert band. It was first awarded in 1956, after band uniform suppliers Ernest and Adolph Ostwald established the ABA/Ostwald Award for the best band composition written in the previous year. Previous rules allowed for compositions of grades 1-6, but the rules are undergoing a transition to focus on grades 1-4 (in 2011) and 5-6 (in 2012). The award was renamed from the Ostwald Award in 2011.

Recipients

References

External links
 Sousa/ABA/Ostwald Contest

American music awards
John Philip Sousa